I Am Here is a Canadian short animated film, directed by Eoin Duffy and released in 2016. The film relates the tale of an intrepid explorer (voiced by Nicholas Campbell) who has travelled the universe in search of ultimate meaning, only to discover that what he was looking for never really existed.

The film was a Canadian Screen Award nominee for Best Animated Short Film at the 5th Canadian Screen Awards.

References

External links
  
 I Am Here at the National Film Board of Canada

2016 films
2010s animated short films
National Film Board of Canada animated short films
2010s English-language films
2010s Canadian films